Kote Tugushi (Georgian: კოტე ტუღუში), (born June 3, 1983) is a Georgian professional basketball coach and former player.  Since 2015, he has coached BC Kutaisi 2010 in Georgia. Also he was an assistant coach of  Georgia's national basketball team. 
As a professional player, he played in Georgia and Iran.
After his retirement as a player he won the Georgian Basketball Championship as head coach of BC Armia Tbilisi.

References

External links
FIBA Profile
Coaching Profile
EuroBasket.com Player Profile

1983 births
Living people
Basketball players from Tbilisi
Men's basketball players from Georgia (country)
Basketball coaches from Georgia (country)
Guards (basketball)